The 2019 Professional Women's Bowling Association (PWBA) Tour retained a similar schedule to the 2018 season, with ten standard tournaments and four majors.

Season overview
The first six standard tournaments of the 2019 season, plus the Striking Against Breast Cancer Mixed Doubles event (a crossover event with the PBA Tour), all start with an open field. The final three standard events of the year feature an “Elite Field” of 24 bowlers, based on season-to-date points, that are automatically placed into the top 32 for match play. The remaining players bowl a qualifying round for the other eight spots in match play.

The final rounds of the first six standard tournaments and the Striking Against Breast Cancer Mixed Doubles event air live on a PBA Xtra Frame Webcast at FloBowling.com. CBS Sports Network airs the final round of the three Elite Field standard tournaments and all major tournaments live.

The USBC Queens and U.S. Women's Open are open to both PWBA members and qualifying USBC members. The PWBA Players Championship major is open to PWBA members only. The season's final event and final major, the PWBA Tour Championship, is an invitational featuring a starting field of only 16 bowlers. Tournament winners from the current season gain automatic entry into the starting field, as long as they are PWBA members. The remaining spots are given to PWBA bowlers with the highest 2019 point totals among non-winners.

Season awards and statistics

Player awards
 PWBA Player of the Year: Shannon O'Keefe
 PWBA Rookie of the Year: Valerie Bercier

2019 points leaders
1. Shannon O'Keefe (148,125)
2. Danielle McEwan (117,085)
3. Dasha Kovalova (109,970)

2019 average leaders (minimum 10 tournaments)
1. Shannon O'Keefe (215.63)
2. Danielle McEwan (211.48)
3. Shannon Pluhowsky (210.90)

2019 championship round appearances
1. Shannon O'Keefe (7)
2. Danielle McEwan (5)
T3. Dasha Kovalova and Maria Jose Rodríguez (4)

Tournament summary

Below is a list of events scheduled for the 2019 PWBA Tour season. Major tournaments are in bold. Career PWBA title numbers for winners are shown in parenthesis (#).

C: broadcast on CBS Sports Network
X: broadcast on the PBA's Xtra Frame Webcast service at FloBowling.com
N: non-member at the time of victory, and thus does not qualify for the PWBA Tour Championship
+: Dasha Kovalova won an additional $10,000 bonus for rolling a 300 game in the title match.

References

External links
PWBA.com, home of the Professional Women' Bowling Association

2019 in bowling